Michael Smith is an American football coach.  Smith was the head football coach at Southern Virginia University  in Buena Vista, Virginia.  He held that position for the 2007 and 2008 seasons.  His coaching record at Southern Virginia was 9–13.

References

Year of birth missing (living people)
Living people
Southern Virginia Knights football coaches